The 2009–10 Wyoming Cowgirls basketball team will represent the University of Wyoming in the 2009–2010 NCAA Division I women's basketball season. The Cowgirls, coached by Joe Legerski, play their home games at the Arena-Auditorium in Laramie, Wyoming. The Cowgirls are a member of the Mountain West Conference and will attempt to win their first NCAA championship.

Offseason
April 20, 2009: The University of Wyoming Cowgirl announced one addition to this year's recruiting class with the signing of Rebecca Campigli to attend the University of Wyoming beginning in the fall of 2009.

Exhibition

Regular season
The Cowgirls will compete in the BlueCross BlueShield of Wyoming Shootout on December 12.

Roster

Schedule

Mountain West tournament

Player stats

Postseason

NCAA basketball tournament

Awards and honors

Team players drafted into the WNBA

See also
2009–10 Wyoming Cowboys basketball team

References

External links
 Official Site

Wyoming Cowgirls basketball seasons
Wyoming
Wyoming Cowgirls
Wyoming Cowgirls